Christopher Roulhac III (born 1947) is an American football coach and former player. He served two stints as the head football coach at the Cheyney University of Pennsylvania from 1992 to 1994 and 2015 to 2017, compiling a record of 5–61. Roulhac played college football at Albany State College in Albany, Georgia.

Head coaching record

College

References

1947 births
Living people
American football tight ends
Albany State Golden Rams football players
Cheyney Wolves football coaches
Colgate Raiders football coaches
Ottawa Rough Riders coaches
Temple Owls football coaches
West Chester Golden Rams football coaches
High school football coaches in Pennsylvania
Sportspeople from Philadelphia
Coaches of American football from Pennsylvania
Players of American football from Philadelphia